Evgenia Aleksandrovna Lopareva (born 5 May 2000) is a Russian ice dancer who competes for France. With her partner, Geoffrey Brissaud, she is the 2023 French national champion, the 2022 Grand Prix de France bronze medalist, the 2022 CS Budapest Trophy silver medalist, and a two-time International Challenge Cup champion (2021 and 2023). Earlier in their career they finished in the top ten at the 2019 World Junior Championships.

Personal life 
Lopareva was born on 30 May 2000 in Moscow, Russia.

Career

Early years 
Lopareva began learning how to skate as a four-year-old in 2004. She competed with her first partner, Alexey Karpushov, for five seasons. The two debuted on the ISU Junior Grand Prix (JGP) series in September 2016, placing fourth in Ostrava, Czech Republic. They had the same overall result at 2018 JGP Austria but did not compete again for the rest of the season. The team ended their partnership before the start of the 2018–19 figure skating season.

2018–19 season 
Before the start of the 2018–19 season, Lopareva teamed up with French ice dancer Geoffrey Brissaud to compete for France. The new team received two international assignments - the 2019 Egna Dance Trophy, where they took silver in the junior division, and the 2019 World Junior Figure Skating Championships, where they placed tenth.

2019–20 season: Senior international debut 
Lopareva/Brissaud made their senior international debut in September at their first assignment of the 2019–20 season, the 2019 CS Nepela Memorial Trophy. Here, the team placed eighth in the rhythm dance but made a comeback in the free dance (fourth) to finish sixth overall. The pair also set new personal bests in all three segments at the event. 

At their next Challenger Series assignment, 2019 CS Warsaw Cup, Lopareva/Brissaud again set another personal best in the rhythm dance.  After taking the bronze medal at the senior French championships, they competed at the European Championships for the first time, placing fifteenth.

2020–21 season: World Championship debut 
Lopareva/Brissaud were scheduled to make their Grand Prix debut at the 2020 Internationaux de France, but the event was cancelled as a result of the COVID-19 pandemic.  They made their World Championship debut at the 2021 World Championships in Stockholm, placing seventeenth. Their placement combined with the sixteenth-place finish of the other French dance team competing at the championships qualified a single berth for France at the 2022 Winter Olympics, as well as the following year's world championships.

2021–22 season 
Lopareva/Brissaud made their seasonal Challenger debut at the 2021 CS Lombardia Trophy, placing eighth. They were initially assigned to make their Grand Prix debut at the 2021 Cup of China, but following its cancellation, they were reassigned to the 2021 Gran Premio d'Italia. They placed sixth at the event, setting new personal bests in the free dance and total score. They went on to finish in fourth place at the 2021 Internationaux de France, setting new personal bests in the rhythm dance and total score. Lopareva said they were "very happy with the result" of their first Grand Prix season.

After winning a silver medal at the International Cup of Nice, Lopareva/Brissaud won their second consecutive national silver medal. They were assigned to the 2022 European Championships in Tallinn, where they finished ninth.

2022–23 season: Challenger and Grand Prix medals 
Lopareva/Brissaud won the silver medal at the 2022 CS Budapest Trophy in their first international appearance of the season. With Gabriella Papadakis and Guillaume Cizeron sitting out at least the season, Lopareva/Brissaud, were the most senior French team assigned to compete at the 2022 Grand Prix de France, where they won the bronze medal, their first on the Grand Prix. They finished fifth at the 2022 NHK Trophy.

At the French championships in Rouen, Lopareva/Brissaud won the national title for the first time in their career. At the 2023 European Championships in Espoo, they finished sixth in the rhythm dance, missing the final flight of the free dance by 0.42 behind Czechs Taschlerová/Taschler. They overtook the Czechs in the free dance, finishing fifth overall.

Programs

With Brissaud

With Karpushov

Competitive highlights 
GP: Grand Prix; CS: Challenger Series; JGP: Junior Grand Prix

With Brissaud for France

With Karpushov for Russia

References

External links 
 

2000 births
Living people
Russian female ice dancers
Figure skaters from Moscow